Abdul Rahim (born 11 February 1913, date of death unknown) was an Afghan athlete, who specialised in the shot put. He competed at the 1936 Summer Olympic Games in the shot put but failed to reach the qualifying distance.

References

External links
 

1913 births
Year of death missing
Place of birth missing
Olympic athletes of Afghanistan
Athletes (track and field) at the 1936 Summer Olympics
Afghan male shot putters